Joseph Morgan (born March 23, 1988) is a former American football wide receiver. He played college football at Illinois and Walsh and was signed by the Saints as an undrafted free agent in 2011.

Professional career

New Orleans Saints
Morgan was signed as an undrafted free agent by the New Orleans Saints on July 27, 2011. Little known at the beginning of training camp, he became a focus of attention after he scored touchdowns in consecutive preseason games, and was considered a strong candidate to make the regular season roster until he suffered a knee injury.  He was placed on injured reserve on September 3, 2011.

In 2012 Morgan made the roster as a backup receiver.  During the first three games of the season, he had only one catch and little impact, but in the Saints' fourth game, at Green Bay, he caught an 80-yard touchdown pass from Drew Brees for his first NFL touchdown and the team's longest play of the season so far.  In the Saints' sixth game at Tampa Bay, he made another spectacular scoring play: after catching a long pass from Brees inside the 10 yard line, he evaded Mark Barron's tackle and managed to stay off the ground, regained his balance and flipped Eric Wright over his head as he stood up, and finally dashed into the end zone before taking a hard hit from Cody Grimm to score what a USA Today writer called "one of the great scoring efforts of the season".

On August 7, 2013, the New Orleans Saints announced that Morgan suffered a torn meniscus and a partially torn ACL during training camp practice and will miss the entire 2013 season. On August 27, 2013, the Saints placed Morgan on injured reserve. On October 26, 2014, head coach Sean Payton announced that Morgan was suspended, for reasons which were not given by him. On December 9, 2014, Joe Morgan was waived by the New Orleans Saints.

Morgan rejoined the Saints on April 2, 2015. He was released on September 5 for final roster cuts before the start of the season. On September 16, he re-signed with the team. On October 24, 2015, he was released by the Saints.

Baltimore Ravens
Morgan signed with the Baltimore Ravens on November 4 after placing wide receiver Steve Smith, Sr. on season ending injured reserve. He was subsequently waived on November 23 without having appeared in a game for the Ravens.

Toronto Argonauts
On October 5, 2016, Morgan signed a practice roster agreement with the Toronto Argonauts of the Canadian Football League. After spending a month on the Argonauts' practice roster until the end of the season, Morgan re-signed with the Argonauts on December 15, 2016. After playing in the preseason games Joseph was released before week 1 of the 2017 season.

Saskatchewan Roughriders

On July 3, 2017, Morgan signed a practice roster agreement with Saskatchewan Roughriders of the Canadian Football League.

References

External links
Toronto Argonauts bio
New Orleans Saints bio
Illinois Fighting Illini bio
CBSSports.com draft profile
NFL Combine player profile

1988 births
Living people
Sportspeople from Canton, Ohio
Players of American football from Canton, Ohio
American football wide receivers
Canadian football wide receivers
American players of Canadian football
Illinois Fighting Illini football players
Walsh Cavaliers football players
New Orleans Saints players
Baltimore Ravens players
Toronto Argonauts players
African-American players of American football
21st-century African-American sportspeople
20th-century African-American people